Barbara Bush: A Memoir is a 1994 memoir by Barbara Bush, the wife of U.S. President George H. W. Bush. It was published as a Lisa Drew book by Charles Scribner's Sons.

References 

1994 non-fiction books
Barbara Bush
Charles Scribner's Sons books